Styrax pentlandianus is a species of flowering plant in the family Styracaceae. It is native to South America.

References

pentlandianus
Trees of Colombia
Trees of Peru
Trees of Bolivia
Trees of Ecuador
Taxonomy articles created by Polbot
Taxobox binomials not recognized by IUCN